Hed PE (stylized as (həd)pe) is the debut album by the American rock band Hed PE. It was released on August 12, 1997 by Jive Records, and has sold over 100,000 copies.

Music
Six of the tracks on this album were re-recorded from the band's debut EP, Church of Realities; The album's musical style is a fusion of punk, hip hop, metal, funk and reggae.

Release
The album sold over 100,000 copies. Due to the label's contractual terms and the disappointing sales of the album, the band found themselves unable to repay the cash advances given to them by Jive.

Jared Gomes is quoted as saying "We had these romantic visions of the music industry, and we thought it would be cool to be a punk band on a rap label. So we fulfilled that dream, but it was also probably the worst thing that could have happened. [...] We've had offers from Sony and others that we can't take because we owe Jive so much money."

The rampageous cover art drawn up by the band's turntablist – DJ Product@1969.“Jive Records [(hed)PE’s label at the time] didn’t trust me doing it, I think the band let me do it because I did the previous cover for the ‘Church of Realities’ EP” explains Product. “The art for the album that came first is what you see on the back of the album. The label and band didn’t think it was a strong enough image for the front cover. It was hand painted, not digital. The [original] cover art was later used for the Japanese release.”“When I made the [re-make] cover I had a place to execute it at. I actually had an apartment for a short time before the band went ‘broke’ again (real title for following album). I was able to sit still and have food and paint supplies to make it happen. It was a very ‘hurry up’ and rushed [piece] because of a deadline from the label [for the artwork] to be turned in.”Going into graphic detail about the graphic’s details, Product notes “Wes [guitarist] came over to my studio one night to create some interludes and stuff for the secret ending of the album. It was very spontaneous, but it just sparked right there that I needed to go back to the drawing board and re-create the cover. Entitled ‘Ball of Chaos’, it was done with pressure of the band and label. I had maybe 24hrs to get something done, otherwise they were gonna use some stock image from the art director at Jive.” It literally was turned in as the paint was still drying.
The album cover is an illustration of the music being played by Hed PE who are seen in the middle playing a concert, while a barrage of music is exploding outwardly.

Reception

In his review of the album, Allmusic's Steve Huey wrote that "There are some slow and/or unfocused moments [...] but overall, its aggression will probably play well with late-'90s metal and punk fans."

Track listing

Personnel

(həd)pe
Jared Gomes — lead vocals; lyrics
Wesley Geer — lead guitar; music
Chizad (Chad Benekos)  — rhythm guitar, backing vocals; music (6, 8, & 12)
Mawk (Mark Young) — bass guitar; music (8, 11, & 12)
DJ Product ©1969 (Doug Boyce) — turntables, backing vocals; music (8, & 12)
B.C. (Ben C. Vaught) — drums; music (8, 10-12, & 14)

References

1997 debut albums
Hed PE albums
Jive Records albums